Erchen Wan is a greyish-brown to yellowish-brown pill used in Traditional Chinese medicine to "remove damp-phlegm and regulate the stomach function". It is used in cases where there is "cough with copious expectoration, sensation of stuffiness in the chest and epigastrium, nausea and vomiting due to the stagnation of damp-phlegm". It is slightly aromatic in odour and tastes slightly pungent and sweet.

Chinese classic herbal formula

See also
 Chinese classic herbal formula
 Bu Zhong Yi Qi Wan

References

Traditional Chinese medicine pills